William Nickerson may refer to:

 William Nickerson Jr. (1879–1945), Los Angeles-based businessman and founder of Golden State Mutual Life Insurance Company
 William Emery Nickerson (1853–1930), American inventor and vice-president of The Gillette Company
 William Henry Snyder Nickerson (1875–1954), Canadian recipient of the Victoria Cross
 William M. Nickerson (born 1933), American judge in Maryland

See also
 Bruce William Nickerson (1941–2022), American civil rights and gay rights attorney
 Nickerson (surname)